Richard A. Hutchinson (February 14, 1853 – July 19, 1921) was an American politician in the state of Washington. He served in the Washington House of Representatives and Washington State Senate.

References

1853 births
1921 deaths
Republican Party members of the Washington House of Representatives
Republican Party Washington (state) state senators